"The Silver Swan" is the most famous madrigal by Orlando Gibbons. It is scored for 5 voices (in most sources, soprano (S), alto (A), tenor (T), baritone (Bar) and bass (B), although some specify SSATB instead) and presents the legend that swans are largely silent in life (or at least unmusical), and sing beautifully only just before their deaths (see swan song).

History and text
The song was first published in Gibbons's First Set of Madrigals and Motets of 5 parts (1612). Gibbons dedicated this collection to his patron, Sir Christopher Hatton (1581–1619). It was normal at this time for composers to seek aristocratic patronage, and for example Hatton's brother-in-law Henry Fanshawe had a set of madrigals dedicated to him the following year by his composer in residence John Ward.
By Gibbons' own account, he used Hatton's London house as a place to compose. Hatton appears to have selected the texts used in the collection: the authors of only some of the songs have been identified.

The anonymous lyrics of "The Silver Swan" are as follows:

 The silver Swan, who, living, had no Note,
 when Death approached, unlocked her silent throat.
 Leaning her breast against the reedy shore,
 thus sang her first and last, and sang no more:
 "Farewell, all joys! O Death, come close mine eyes!
  More Geese than Swans now live, more Fools than Wise."

The last line may be a comment on the demise of the English madrigal form or, more generally, on the loss of the late Elizabethan musical tradition. The English madrigal school flourished from the late 1580s and lasted into the 1620s, long after it had become unfashionable in the rest of Europe. But things were already in decline by the time The Silver Swan was published in 1612. The last line could be taken as a biting condemnation of contemporary madrigal composers – though Gibbons himself was only in his thirties.

Music
Commenting on the musical form, Philip Ledger notes that "in common with the lute-song, and unlike any true madrigal, it has two musical sections, the second one repeated, and new words are provided for this repeat".

Though composed as a madrigal, "The Silver Swan" is, in modern times, often performed as a song for chamber choir. It is also performed as a song for soprano and viol consort.

Other settings of the poem
The words to this madrigal have been set to music by the following composers and groups:
Gary Bachlund (1966), for a cappella SATB chorus.
Garth Baxter, from Three Madrigals (for voice and piano, voice and guitar, or SATB).
John Musto (1987), from Canzonettas for high voice or medium voice and piano.
Ned Rorem (1949), for high voice and piano.
Qntal (2006), on their album Qntal V: Silver Swan.
Lori Laitman (2007), for voice and piano, or voice, flute and piano. Recordings available on Within These Spaces and Living in the Body.
Oliver Tarney (2018), for SSA and piano from the secular upper-voices anthology As you sing.

Notes

References
Philip Ledger (editor), The Oxford Book of English Madrigals, Oxford University Press: 1978, with co-issued recording by Pro Cantione Antiqua.

Further reading

External links

English madrigals
Compositions by Orlando Gibbons
Songs about birds